The 1982 Scottish Cup Final was played on 22 May 1982 at Hampden Park in Glasgow. Aberdeen and Rangers contested the match; the final of the 107th Scottish Cup. Aberdeen won 4–1, after extra time goals from McGhee, Strachan and Cooper. This marked the first cup win for a team outwith the Old Firm for over ten years.

Summary
John MacDonald opened the scoring for Rangers after 15 minutes with a diving header from six yards out after a cross from the right hand side. Aberdeen equalized in the 32nd minute when Alex McLeish curled the ball into the net with his right foot from the left edge of the penalty area after the ball had been cleared from a corner. The match went to extra-time and in the 3rd minute Mark McGhee scored with a header after a cross from the right. Gordon Strachan put Aberdeen 3-1 in front with a tap into an empty net after a cross from the left. Neale Cooper got the fourth goal for Aberdeen when he ran clear in on goal and despite a challenge from the Rangers goalkeeper Jim Stewart the ball broke free with Cooper shooting into the empty net.

Match details

References 
Scotland - Cup Results 1873/74-1877/78 and 1889/90-1995/96, RSSSF
Results/Fixtures, Soccerbase

See also
 Aberdeen F.C.–Rangers F.C. rivalry

1982
Cup Final
Aberdeen F.C. matches
Rangers F.C. matches
20th century in Glasgow